Lebanese Airlines (الخطوط الجوية اللبنانية) was an airline based in Beirut, Lebanon. Lebanese Airlines had a fleet of 8 aircraft and flew to 10 cities. In 2018 it ceased all operations.

Fleet
As of September 2017, the Lebanese Airlines fleet consists of the following aircraft:

See also 
List of defunct airlines of Lebanon

Defunct airlines of Lebanon
Airlines established in 2016
Airlines disestablished in 2018